Liaquat Ahamed (born 14 November 1952 in Kenya) is an American author.

Life and work
Liaquat Ahamed was born in Kenya, where his grandfather had emigrated to from Gujarat by way of Zanzibar in the late 19th century. He was educated at Rugby School in England, at Trinity College, Cambridge, and at Harvard University. 

Ahamed has worked at the World Bank in Washington D.C., where he headed the bank's investment division, and at the New York-based partnership of Fischer, Francis Trees and Watts, a fixed-income business and subsidiary of BNP Paribas, where he served as Chief Investment Officer and from 2001–2004 as Chief Executive.  From October 2007 he has been a director of Aspen Insurance Holdings and in addition advises several hedge funds, including Rock Creek Group and The Rohatyn Group. He is a member of Board of Trustees at the Brookings Institution and is involved with the New America Foundation.

Through his production company, Red Wine Pictures, Ahamed was a producer on the 2006 film The Situation, set in Iraq.

Lords of Finance

Ahamed is the author of Lords of Finance: The Bankers Who Broke the World (2009). The book was awarded the 2010 Pulitzer Prize for History, the 2010 Spear's Book Award (Financial History Book of the Year), the 2010 Arthur Ross Book Award Gold Medal, the 2009 Financial Times and Goldman Sachs Business Book of the Year Award. For 2009 it was recognized as one of Time magazine's "Best Books of the Year", New York Times "Best Books of the Year" and Amazon.com's "Best Books of the Year". It was shortlisted for the Samuel Johnson Prize. It is published by Penguin Books (USA) Inc. .

The book narrates the events preceding the Black Tuesday stock market crash of 1929 and the disastrous response of the world's major central banks. It follows the life and actions of the then chiefs of the central banks: Benjamin Strong Jr. of the New York Federal Reserve, Montagu Norman of the Bank of England, Émile Moreau of the Banque de France, and Hjalmar Schacht of the Reichsbank. John Maynard Keynes, a British  well-known economist of the time appears on many occasions in the book in a role opposing the central bankers. The main theme of the book is the role played by the central bankers' insistence to adhere to the gold standard "even in the face of total catastrophe".

In June 2012, Ahamed himself drew a similar parallel in a Financial Times column, saying that "during the past few months, as the crisis in Europe has spiralled out of control", he had "begun to fear that the world might in fact be repeating some of th[e] same errors" as those made in the 1920s and 1930s. While the 21st-century central bankers and banks were starkly different from their 19th-century predecessors, Ahamed said that "as they experiment with unconventional monetary tools to get the global economy moving, ironically they may find their years of training less useful than their instincts. ... [S]ome of the same intractable factors that their predecessors of the 1930s had to contend with will overwhelm them once again", today's bankers fear. France, Ahamed pointed out, was the strongest economy and financial system in 1930s Europe, while Germany was reeling. And like Germany seemingly in 2012, France in the 1930s could not find a way to use its strength to help its neighbor. Ahamed in June 2012 concluded with a question: "If, over the next few months, a financial accident takes place in Europe, as is likely, is there any European institution willing and able to act as fast and with such vigour [as the 2008, Lehman-bankruptcy-era US Fed and Treasury] to prevent a disaster?"

Personal life
Ahamed comes from the Nizari Ismaili Shia sect, and he is a non-practising Muslim. His wife, Meenakshi "Meena" Singh, is an Indian freelance journalist who is active with Médecins Sans Frontières and other charitable organizations. Their daughter Tara is married to actor Jonathan Tucker.

References

External links
 

Living people
Alumni of Trinity College, Cambridge
American economics writers
American male non-fiction writers
Pulitzer Prize for History winners
American financial writers
Economic historians
21st-century American historians
21st-century American male writers
Harvard University alumni
American chief executives of financial services companies
1952 births
Kenyan emigrants to the United States
American people of Gujarati descent
American Ismailis
Kenyan Ismailis